Alex Nelson (born 1975) is an American singer-songwriter.

Alex Nelson may also refer to:

Alexander Nelson (born 1988), British sprinter
Alexander Nelson (British Army officer) (1814–1893), British army officer